The (Q,r) model is a class of models in inventory theory. A general (Q,r) model can be extended from both the EOQ model and the base stock model

Overview

Assumptions

 Products can be analyzed individually
 Demands occur one at a time (no batch orders)
 Unfilled demand is back-ordered (no lost sales)
 Replenishment lead times are fixed and known
 Replenishments are ordered one at a time
 Demand is modeled by a continuous probability distribution
 There is a fixed cost associated with a replenishment order
 There is a constraint on the number of replenishment orders per year

Variables

 = Expected demand per year
 = Replenishment lead time
 = Demand during replenishment lead time
 = probability density function of demand during lead time
 = cumulative distribution function of demand during lead time
 = mean demand during lead time
 = setup or purchase order cost per replenishment
 = unit production cost
 = annual unit holding cost
 = cost per stockout
 = annual unit backorder cost
 = replenishment quantity
 = reorder point
, safety stock level
 = order frequency
 = fill rate
 = average number of outstanding back-orders
 = average on-hand inventory level

Costs

The annual stockout cost is proportional to D[1 - S(Q,r)], with the fill rate beying:

Backorder cost approach

The annual backorder cost is proportional to backorder level:

Total cost function and optimal reorder point

The total cost is given by the sum of setup costs, purchase order cost, backorders cost and inventory carrying cost:

The optimal reorder quantity and optimal reorder point are given by:

{| class="toccolours collapsible collapsed" width="90%" style="text-align:left"
!Proof
|-
|To minimize set the partial derivatives of Y equal to zero:

And solve for G(r) and Q.
|}

Normal distribution

In the case lead-time demand is normally distributed:

Stockout cost approach

The total cost is given by the sum of setup costs, purchase order cost, stockout cost and inventory carrying cost:

What changes with this approach is the computation of the optimal reorder point:

Lead-Time Variability
X is the random demand during replenishment lead time:

In expectation:

Variance of demand is given by:

Hence standard deviation is:

Poisson distribution

if demand is Poisson distributed:

See also

 Infinite fill rate for the part being produced: Economic order quantity
 Constant fill rate for the part being produced: Economic production quantity
 Demand is random: classical Newsvendor model
 Demand is random, continuous replenishment: Base stock model
 Demand varies deterministically over time: Dynamic lot size model
 Several products produced on the same machine: Economic lot scheduling problem

References

Inventory optimization